George Steeves (b. ca. 1945) is a Canadian art photographer noted for his highly personal work. He has been called by art historian and curator Martha Langford, "among the foremost figures of contemporary Canadian photography."

Life
Born in Moncton, New Brunswick, Steeves attended school in Ottawa and studied engineering at Carleton University and Cornell University, Ithaca, New York. He has lived in Halifax, Nova Scotia since 1973 and worked as an engineer with the Bedford Institute of Oceanography, where he was supervisor of mechanical and oceanographic systems development before retiring in 2006. In the 1970s, he began making urban landscape photographs using an 8x10 negative camera and developing and printing his own work. In 1981, inspired by local performance artist Ellen Pierce, he decided to focus on figurative work. Apparently needing to know his subjects very well before photographing them, he often spends more time talking than actually taking pictures. He has forged deep friendships with some of his subjects, whom he has continued to photograph on numerous occasions. With this approach, and the trust he engenders in his subjects, he has achieved a deeply personal, intimate body of work.

Probably because of the often erotic nature of his pictures, he has worked largely in obscurity within his own community. A 1989 exhibit at the Nova Scotia College of Art and Design was publicly opposed and posters were removed. After the show ended, his works were damaged when they were removed from the walls. A 1993 exhibition at the Canadian Museum of Contemporary Photography in Ottawa was more successful. His work has also been shown at the Louisiana Museum of Modern Art in Denmark and the Saidye Bronfman Centre for the Arts in Montreal. A thirty-year retrospective exhibition was mounted at Mount Saint Vincent University Art Gallery in 2007 and in 2011 he curated and wrote the catalogue essay for the exhibition, Lisette Model: A Performance in Photography which ran from October 8 through November 20, 2011 at MSVU Art Gallery. His works are included in the collections of the National Gallery of Canada and Mount Saint Vincent University. He currently lives and works in Halifax with his wife, Ingrid Jenkner.

Notes

References
 Sue Carter Flynn, The Coast, "Elementary: Self-taught photographer George Steeves has been taking provocative shots—of artists, of lovers, of himself—for more than three decades", February 22, 2007
 Mount St. Vincent Exhibition (includes examples)
 Two images - Shakespeare in Canadian Art
 Bedford Institute

Further reading
  Langford, Martha. Atlantic Parallels. Exhibition Catalogue. Ottawa: National Film Board of Canada, Still Photography Division, 1980.
  Livingstone, David, "Water, water everywhere but here (Canadian Centre of Photography, Toronto)," Maclean's (Dec. 15, 1980): 59.
  Dunbrack, Janet. "Moving Forward: the Photography of George Steeves." Arts Atlantic 20 (Vol. 5, No. 4, 1984): 42-45.
  National Film Board of Canada, Still Photography Division. Contemporary Canadian Photography from the Collection of the National Film Board. Edmonton: Hurtig Publishers, 1984.
  Steeves, George. Artist's statement. In exhibition catalogue for Edges. Halifax: Mount Saint Vincent University Art Gallery, 1987.
  Langford, Martha. "On George Steeves' Edges." Blackflash (vol. 6, No. 4, 1988): 5-8.
  Brunner, Astrid, "George Steeves: edges," Arts Atlantic (Spring-Summer 1989): 26-27.
  Garvey, Susan Gibson. "George Steeves." In exhibition catalogue for The Tenth Dalhousie Drawing Exhibition. Halifax: Dalhousie University, 1990.
  Langford, Martha, "The Autobiography of George Steeves." In exhibition catalogue for Le Mois de la photo a Montreal: Vox Populi, 1991, pp. 78–83.
  Gersovitz, S.V., "George Steeves," Arts Atlantic (Winter 1992): 22,25.
  Nancy Baele, "Pain as a path to understanding," The Ottawa Citizen, Sept. 20, 1993, p. B10.
  Dessureault, Pierre. "George Steeves: The art of the overstatement." In exhibition catalogue for EXILE: a Journey with Astrid Brunner. Fredericton: Gallery Connexion, 1993.
  Bentley, "George Steeves: exile: a journey with Astrid Brunner," Arts Atlantic (Fall 1993) 29-33.
  Langford, Martha, George Steeves, 1979–1993, 1994, Canadian Museum of Contemporary Photography/The University of Chicago Press. 
  Morose, Edward, "George Steeves: Ensemble-separe," Arts Atlantic (Fall-Winter 1997): 8-9.
  Dorota Kozinska "Fruits of a profound inner dialogue" The Gazette, Montreal, Feb. 14, 1998, p. J6.
  Stephane Aquin, "George Steeves: Journel d'un Impudique," Voir [Montreal], Vol. 12, No. 8, (26 Fev. 1998): 48.
  Epp, Colin Brent, "Recovering Portraiture," Blackflash, (Spring 1998): 15.
  Silver Donald Cameron, "Dark themes, poetry in light," The Halifax Herald (19 Nov. 2000): C3.
  Steeves, George, "Lisette Model: A Performance in Photography" ABC Art Books Canada.
  Penny Cousineau-Levine Faking Death: Canadian Art Photography and the Canadian Imagination (2003), McGill-Queen's University Press.
  George Steeves, Exposures - photographs with poems by Liane Heller and introduction by Astrid Brunner, (2003) Lakeville Corner NB: AB Collector Publishing.
  George Steeves Photographs - essay by Peter Schwenger; introduction by Ingrid Jenkner, (2007) Halifax, N.S. : MSVU Art Gallery.  https://web.archive.org/web/20070403194355/http://www.abcartbookscanada.com/one.html
  Carter Flinn, Sue, "George Steeves: Elementary," The Coast (22 February-1 March 2007): Cover and 14-17. http://www.thecoast.ca/permalink.lasso?ei|150316.113118|Elementary
  Lisk, Dean, "Steeves’s Naked Truth," HFX/The Daily News (1 March 2007): 14.
  Barnard, Elissa, "‘Melodrama without a script’", The Chronicle Herald [Halifax] (3 March 2007): C14.
  Carter Flinn, Sue "Akimblog Halifax", Akimbo.biz (4 April 2007): http://www.akimbo.biz/akimblog/index.php?id=102 [scroll to bottom]
  Langford, Martha, "George Steeves", Border Crossings (Vol. 26, No. 2, Issue 102 (2007): 108-110.
  Holt, Jason, "The Photographic Excavations of George Steeves", Visual Arts News (Vol. 29, No. 2 (Summer 2007): 25-28.
  Moynihan, Conor and Jonathan D. Katz, "Drama Queer", in Drama Queer (Vancouver, BC: Pride in Art Society, 2017): 9-10; 64-71.

Films
 Portrait of the Artist as His Muse (2003 film)
 Race is a Four Letter Word (stills credit)

External links
 Exposure Online Magazine: George Steeves

1945 births
Artists from New Brunswick
Canadian photographers
Living people
Writers from Moncton